Seasons of Our Love is a 1966 Italian drama film directed by Florestano Vancini. It was entered into the 16th Berlin International Film Festival.

Cast
Enrico Maria Salerno	... 	Vittorio Borghi
Anouk Aimée	... 	Francesca
Jacqueline Sassard	... 	Elena
Gastone Moschin	... 	Tancredi
Valeria Valeri	... 	Milena Borghi, moglie di Vittorio
Gian Maria Volonté	... 	Leonardo Varzi
Checco Rissone	... 	Olindo Civenini
Daniele Vargas	... 	Il conte
Elena Ballesio		
Pietro Tordi	... 	Mario Borghi
Massimo Giuliani	... 	Leonardo Varzi da ragazzo
Albano Bissoni	... 	Un partigiano alla cascina
Umberto Bertagna	... 	Un partigiano alla cascina
Luciano Damiani		
Isa Mancini

References

External links 
 

1966 films
1960s Italian-language films
1966 drama films
Italian black-and-white films
Films directed by Florestano Vancini
Films scored by Carlo Rustichelli
1960s Italian films